Bratia may refer to several places in Romania:

 Bratia, a village in Berevoești Commune, Argeș County
 Bratia, a village in Ciomăgești Commune, Argeș County
 Bratia (river), a tributary of the Râul Târgului in Argeș County